The Abe Mizet (English: Midget) is a homebuilt aircraft design from builder Keiichi Abe of Japan. The aircraft was built with help from the Kushiro Aero Club. The Mizet is a rare example of a homebuilt aircraft designed and built for operations in Japan.

Design
The Abe Mizet is a single-place open-cockpit, pusher, high-wing aircraft with tricycle landing gear, similar to a Breezy aircraft homebuilt design.

Keiichi Abe also assisted Don Taylor on the Japanese leg of his round-the-world flight in a homebuilt aircraft.

Specifications (Mizet II)

References

Homebuilt aircraft